In mathematics, a subset  of a preordered set  is said to be cofinal or frequent in  if for every  it is possible to find an element  in  that is "larger than " (explicitly, "larger than " means ). 

Cofinal subsets are very important in the theory of directed sets and nets, where “cofinal subnet” is the appropriate generalization of "subsequence".

Definitions 

Let  be a homogeneous binary relation on a set  
For every  there exists some  that  

A subset that is not frequent is called . 
This definition is most commonly applied when  is a directed set, which is a preordered set with additional properties. 

Final functions

Coinitial subsets

For every  there exists some  such that  

This is the order-theoretic dual to the notion of cofinal subset. 
Cofinal (respectively coinitial) subsets are precisely the dense sets with respect to the right (respectively left) order topology.

Properties 

The cofinal relation over partially ordered sets ("posets") is reflexive: every poset is cofinal in itself.

For a partially ordered set with maximal elements, every cofinal subset must contain all maximal elements, otherwise a maximal element that is not in the subset would fail to be  any element of the subset, violating the definition of cofinal. For a partially ordered set with a greatest element, a subset is cofinal if and only if it contains that greatest element (this follows, since a greatest element is necessarily a maximal element). Partially ordered sets without greatest element or maximal elements admit disjoint cofinal subsets. For example, the even and odd natural numbers form disjoint cofinal subsets of the set of all natural numbers. 

If a partially ordered set  admits a totally ordered cofinal subset, then we can find a subset  that is well-ordered and cofinal in  

If  is a directed set and if  is a cofinal subset of  then  is also a directed set.

Examples and sufficient conditions 

Any superset of a cofinal subset is itself cofinal. 

If  is a directed set and if some union of (one or more) finitely many subsets  is cofinal then at least one of the set  is cofinal. This property is not true in general without the hypothesis that  is directed.

Subset relations and neighborhood bases

Let  be a topological space and let  denote the neighborhood filter at a point  
The superset relation  is a partial order on : explicitly, for any sets  and  declare that  if and only if  (so in essence,  is equal to ). 
that is, if and only if for every  there exists some  such that  (I.e. such that .)

Cofinal subsets of the real numbers

For any  the interval  is a cofinal subset of  but it is  a cofinal subset of  
The set  of natural numbers (consisting of positive integers) is a cofinal subset of  but this is  true of the set of negative integers  

Similarly, for any  the interval  is a cofinal subset of  but it is  a cofinal subset of  
The set  of negative integers is a cofinal subset of  but this is  true of the natural numbers  

Cofinal set of subsets 

A particular but important case is given if  is a subset of the power set  of some set  ordered by reverse inclusion  Given this ordering of  a subset  is cofinal in  if for every  there is a  such that  

For example, let  be a group and let  be the set of normal subgroups of finite index.

See also 

 
 
  

References

 
  

Order theory